The 1922 Bucknell football team was an American football team that represented Bucknell University as an independent during the 1922 college football season. In its fourth season under head coach Pete Reynolds, the team compiled a 7–4 record. With 260 points scored, the team ranked sixth in the country in team scoring. The team played its home games at Tustin Field in Lewisburg, Pennsylvania.

Schedule

References

Bucknell
Bucknell Bison football seasons
Bucknell football